The football tournament at the 1956 Spartakiad of Peoples of the USSR was a preparatory competition for the Soviet Union national football team for the upcoming 1956 Summer Olympics. The competition took place on August 2 – 16, 1956 as part of the Spartakiad of Peoples of the USSR.

Competition

Main tournament

Qualification round
 Latvia - Azerbaijan 1:5
 Estonia - Lithuania 0:1

Round of 16
 Armenia - Tajikistan 3:0
 Belarus - Kyrgyzstan 1:0
 Azerbaijan - Karelia 5:1
 Georgia - Moldova 4:0
 Russia - Uzbekistan 3:1
 Leningrad - Turkmenistan 2:0
 Ukraine - Kazakhstan 2:1
 Moscow - Lithuania 2:0

Quarterfinals
 Russia - Leningrad 0:2
 Georgia - Armenia 4:2
 Ukraine - Azerbaijan 4:1
 Moscow - Belarus 5:1

Semifinals
 Georgia - Ukraine 3:1
 Moscow - Leningrad 3:2

Final
 Moscow - Georgia 2:1

For 3rd place
 Ukraine - Leningrad 2:1

Consolation tournament for quarterfinalists

Semifinals
 Azerbaijan - Armenia 0:3
 Russia - Belarus 4:2

For 7th place
 Azerbaijan - Belarus 0:2

For 5th place
 Armenia - Russia 2:1

Consolation tournament

Quarterfinals
 Latvia - Kazakhstan 2:1
 Moldova - Tajikistan 6:0
 Uzbekistan - Turkmenistan 3:0
 Estonia - Kyrgyzstan 2:1
 Karelia - bye
 Lithuania - bye

Semifinals
 Karelia - Latvia 0:5
 Moldova - Uzbekistan 4:3
 Estonia - Lithuania 0:2

For 10th place
 Moldova - Lithuania 4:1

For 9th place
 Latvia - Moldova 2:1

For 12th place
 Uzbekistan - Karelia 2:1
 Uzbekistan - Estonia 2:0

Tournament for losing teams

Semifinals
 Kazakhstan - Tajikistan 3:0
 Turkmenistan - Kyrgyzstan 0:1

For 15th place
 Kazakhstan - Kyrgyzstan 2:1

For 17th place
 Tajikistan - Turkmenistan 2:3

External links
 First Spartakiad of Peoples of the USSR (I СПАРТАКИАДА НАРОДОВ СССР 1956 года ). Vladimir Glubokov website.
 1956 season at FootballFacts.ru

1956
Spartakiad of Peoples of the USSR